Khu Bua is an archaeological site 12 km southeast of the town Ratchaburi, Thailand. It dates from the 6th century Dvaravati culture and was one of major cities of this kingdom.

Within the roughly rectangular site of around 800x2000 m surrounded by an earthen wall and a moat 44 archaeological sites were found within and outside the wall, with the foundations of Wat Khlong Suwannakhiri being the largest and best preserved. Excavations were done in 1957, 1960 and 1961. The findings - ceramic figurines, wheels of law and stone tablets - are now at display at the National Museum in Ratchaburi and Bangkok, as well as in the small museum next to Wat Khlong.The architectural and artistic features are those of the Indian Gupta Dynasty, which promoted buddhism in the region after it was first introduced during the reign of Ashoka.Evidence has been found to suggest that Buddhism has flourished in Thailand for over 1,000 years, with more than 60 traces of ancient sites, and most of them are places of worship related to Buddhism, both in Theravada and Mahayana cult. By the objects excavated in the Khu Bua city area A sculpture of stucco and clay Used to decorate buildings such as Buddha images, Bodhisattva, angels or noble people, etc. It is also found. Tools Various accessories that reflect the advanced technological developments of the time And it can be assumed that the city of Khu Bua prospered in the Dvaravati period, around 11-16 Buddhist centuries and most of the artifacts found Currently preserved at the Ratchaburi National Museum.There has been a stucco image of a female musician discovered in Khu Bua archaeological site.
Reflect the culture of those days

Wat Khlong was registered as a historical site in 1962.

References

External links

Ban Khu Bua Ancient Town

Further reading

Archaeological sites in Thailand
Former populated places in Thailand
Geography of Ratchaburi province
Buildings and structures in Ratchaburi province
Dvaravati